Stars Association for Sports, or simply SAS, is a women's football club section of the similarly-named sports academy, based in Aley, Lebanon. Founded in 2011 as Stars Academy for Sports, they have competed in the Lebanese Women's Football League since 2014.

SAS have won six league titles, three FA Cup titles, and one Super Cup title, and were runners-up in the inaugural edition of the WAFF Women's Clubs Championship in 2019.

History
Established in 2011 as "Stars Academy for Sports" (SAS), the senior team debuted in the Lebanese Women's Football League in 2013–14. They won the 2014–15 league title after beating Girls Football Academy (GFA) in the final matchday of the season, on 23 July 2015, and won the FA Cup by beating FC Beirut 3–0 in the final, on 28 August 2015. SAS won three consecutive league titles, between the 2014–15 and 2016–17 season.

Ahead of the 2017–18 season, SAS changed their name to "Stars Association for Sports". They achieved their second domestic double in 2018–19 by winning both the league (their fourth in total) and the cup (their second).

In 2019 SAS took part in the inaugural edition of the WAFF Women's Clubs Championship, an international club competition for West Asian (WAFF) clubs, along with four other clubs. After winning their opening two matches, against Arab Orthodox (7–0) and Abu Dhabi (2–1), SAS lost against eventual champions Shabab Ordon (3–0), before drawing the last game of the tournament against Riffa (3–3) to finish as runners-up.

On 1 March 2020, SAS won 4–2 against newly-founded Eleven Football Pro (EFP) in the effective final of the 2019–20 season, becoming five-time champions of the league. They won their sixth league title in the 2021–22 season, after defeating defending champions Safa 2–1 in the final matchday.

Players

Current squad

Managerial history
Below is a list of SAS managers from 2014 until the present day.

Honours

Domestic 
Lebanese Women's Football League
Winners (6): 2014–15, 2015–16, 2016–17, 2018–19, 2019–20, 2021–22
Lebanese Women's FA Cup
Winners (3): 2013–14, 2014–15, 2018–19
Runners-up (2): 2016–17, 2017–18
Lebanese Women's Super Cup
Winners (1): 2016–17
Runners-up (3): 2015–16, 2017–18, 2018–19

Continental 
 WAFF Women's Clubs Championship
 Runners-up (1): 2019

Continental record 
WAFF Women's Clubs Championship: 1 appearance
2019: Runners-up

See also
 Lebanese Women's Football League
 Women's football in Lebanon
 List of women's association football clubs in Lebanon

References

External links

Stars Association for Sports at the-waff.com

 
Women's football clubs in Lebanon
2014 establishments in Lebanon
Association football clubs established in 2014